Olga Evgenevna Kryuchkova (Russian: Ольга Евгеньевна Крючкова), pseudonym Olivia Claymore (Russian: Оливия Клеймор) (born 7 August 1966), a Russian historical and mystical writer.
To date, Kryuchkova is the author of 25 novels  and published by "Veche" (Russian: "Вече").

Biography 

Olga Kryuchkov was born in Moscow on 7 August 1966.

In 1986 she enrolled in the Moscow Aviation Institute the faculty of aircraft. Institute and graduated in 1992. Her literary career began in 2006. Her first novel, "Captain Marauder" was published in the journal publishers «Feat-Centaur» in" historical bestseller "(2007). Then, in the same year 2007, came love-historical novel "Family Cross" publisher "Geleos" in series "Lace Love".

In 2008, she published six novels, the writer (one published under a pseudonym). In January 2008, her novel "Adventurers," publisher "Feat-Centaur". The publishing house "Geleos" came out four publications: "The gift of Aphrodite", "Happy choice", "Riddles of Fate" and under the pseudonym of Olivia Claymore her novel "The French Messalina". In the same year the author was first published in publishing house "Veche": a book under the title "Captain Marauder" includes two novels - "Captain Marauder" and "Demon Montsegur".

In 2009 came another four novels: "Adventurers", "Rose of Versailles", "Return of Captain Marauder" and "Heirs of the country of Yamato". All four novels were published by the publishing house "Veche"

Book 
Published works and e-books.

 Russian adventure novel. Russia, 19th century:
 "Adventurers" ("Авантюристы"), 2009, 2013
 "Rose of Versailles" ("Роза Версаля"), 2009
 "Armor of Dracula" ("Доспехи Дракулы"), 2010
 "Family Cross" ("Фамильный крест"), 2007
 "The Gift of Aphrodite" ("Дары Афродиты"), 2008
 "Riddles of Fate" ("Загадки Судьбы"), 2008
 "Happy Choice" ("Счастливый выбор"), 2008
 "Duelist" ("Дуэлянты"), 2011
 "Emerald summer" ("Изумрудное лето"), 2011
 Historical adventure. The Middle Ages, the ancient times:
 "Captain Marauder" ("Капитан мародёров"), 2007, 2008, 2011, 2016
 "The Return of Captain Marauder" ("Возвращение капитана мародёров"), 2009, 2011
 "Captain of marauders. Heavenly Zion" ("Капитан Мародёров. Небесный Сион"), 2011
 "Demon Montsegur" ("Демон Монсегюра"), 2008, 2016
 "Heirs of the country of Yamato" ("Наследники страны Ямато"), 2009, 2016
 "Blood and the Cross" ("Кровь и крест"), 2010
 "The Ark of Power" ("Ковчег могущества"), 2010, 2016
 "King of Austrasia" ("Король Австразии"), 2011
 "Nibelung. Dragon's blood" ("Нибелунги. Кровь Дракона"), 2011, 2015
 Mystic:
 "City of the Gods" ("Город богов"), 2011, 2014
 "Holy Hills" ("Священные холмы"), 2011, 2014
 "The Prelate" ("Прелат"), 2011
 "The servant of Lucifer" ("Слуга Люцифера"), 2011, 2017
 Love historical novel:
 "The Lady of the heart" ("Дама Сердца")("Dark knight"("Черный рыцарь")), 2011, 2016
 "History of the Purple Lady" ("История Пурпурной Дамы"), 2011, 2016
 "Lady-in-waiting of Jade lady" ("Фрейлина нефритовой госпожи"), 2016
 Slavic Fantasy:
 "Children of Irii. Ladomira" ("Дети Ирия. Ладомира"), 2016
 "Children of Irii. Mecheslav" ("Дети Ирия. Мечеслав"), 2016

Published under the pseudonym Olivia Claymore 
 Love historical novel:
 "The French Messalina" ("Французская Мессалина"), 2008

References

External links
Official site 
Kryuchkova Olga. Veche Official site 
Литературная газета."Превратности эпох" 

1966 births
Living people
Russian women novelists
Russian historical novelists
Women historical novelists